Mute is a British online magazine that covers a wide spectrum of subjects related to cyberculture, artistic practice, left-wing politics, urban regeneration, biopolitics, direct democracy, net art, the commons, horizontality and UK arts.

Founded in 1994 by art school graduates Simon Worthington and Pauline van Mourik Broekman, the magazine is an experimental hybrid of web and print formats, publishing articles weekly online, contributed by both staff and readers, and a biannual print compilation combining  selections from current issues and other online content with specially commissioned and co-published projects. Contributors to Mute have included Heath Bunting, James Flint, Hari Kunzru, Anthony Davies and Simon Ford, Stewart Home, Kate Rich, Jamie King, Daniel Neofetou, Nils Norman, and Peter Linebaugh. The magazine was supported by the Arts Council of England from 1999 to 2012.

In 2009, the magazine produced an anthology, Proud to be Flesh: A Mute Magazine Anthology of Cultural Politics After the Net, published by Autonomedia.

References

Further reading

External links
 

1994 establishments in the United Kingdom
Biannual magazines published in the United Kingdom
Visual arts magazines published in the United Kingdom
Online magazines published in the United Kingdom
Internet art
Internet culture
Magazines published in London
Magazines established in 1994
Mass media about Internet culture